Fluid Components International (FCI), headquartered in San Marcos, California, is a manufacturer of thermal dispersion flow and level measurement instrumentation. FCI has two divisions, one serving customers with measurement needs in industrial process and plant applications and an aerospace division, which produces level, temperature, flow and pressure sensors for aircraft manufacturers. FCI was a pioneer in developing thermal dispersion technology and holds numerous design and technology patents for its application in flow and level measurement.

The industrial division's products include gas mass flow meters, air flow meters, biogas flow meters, thermal mass flow meters, gas flow switches, liquid flow switches, flow sensors, level switches, and flow conditioners. FCI's aerospace products include temperature sensors, liquid level and interface sensors, flow sensors, pressure sensors, and flow conditioners.

FCI is an ISO 9001:2000 and AS 9100 certified manufacturer.

FCI operates a NIST flow calibration laboratory with 19 precision flow stands. FCI utilizes these precision flow stands to flow actual gases and reference fluids matched to the temperature, process conditions, and line size of individual customer flow meter applications.

The company has subsidiaries in Tilburg, Netherlands, Beijing, China and Dammam, Saudi Arabia. FCI is represented in 105 countries and has full factory service centers located in the United States, Europe, Asia, and the Middle East.

History
FCI was founded in 1964 in Canoga Park, California by Robert (Bob) Deane and Malcom (Mac) McQueen.

In 1978, FCI began its nuclear division to deliver level, flow, and temperature measurement solutions to the nuclear power industry. These products have the certifications and credentials that comply with global standards for nuclear plant installations.

In 1980, FCI relocated its corporate and manufacturing headquarters to San Marcos, California (near San Diego). In order to support FCI's increasing international customer base, the company opened the European Sales and Service Center in the Netherlands in 1993.

In 2001, FCI received AS 9100 certification. FCI's design, manufacturing and calibration systems, processes, and facilities are continuously reviewed and audited.

In 2010, Control Global Magazine Reader Choice awards for Thermal Flowmeters and Flow Switches were awarded to FCI.

References

External links
 FCI Global Website FCI Global Website- Spanish  FCI Global Website- German  FCI Global Website- Chinese  ISA Directory of Automation  Measurement, Control, & Automation Association

Companies based in San Marcos, California
Manufacturing companies based in California
American companies established in 1964